The British Rail Class 107 diesel multiple units were built by the Derby Works of British Railways and were introduced in 1960. The class looked similar to the later Class 108 units, but were heavier - having been built out of steel.

Usage
The Class 107s were initially built for suburban workings on the south side of Glasgow and the Class remained in BR's Scottish Region for its service life. When new, a number were used on Dundee/Arbroath services. In later years, they were used almost exclusively on services radiating from Glasgow Central to such destinations as Barrhead, East Kilbride, and Kilmacolm, and - prior to electrification - on Glasgow/Ayrshire services (especially Largs). Most were withdrawn from service by 1991.

Many of the units went into departmental use after being withdrawn from passenger use.  The class suffered from a structural problem, however, which could result in the bodies separating from the chassis under heavy braking.

Orders

Originally, there were no fixed set formations, but eventually, sets were numbered as 107425-449 in DMBS order (the DMCLs & TSLs were formed into the sets at random). Renumbered to 107725-749 in 1988 to avoid confusion of set numbers with new 156 units which also had 4xx numbers. Renumbered again to 107025-049 about 1990 to avoid similar confusion with new class 158s numbered in 7xx series.

Other technical details
 Coupling Code: Blue Square
 Transmission: Standard mechanical

For coupling codes see British United Traction

Preservation
Several examples of the class have entered preservation.

References

Notes

Sources
Motive Power Recognition: 3 DMUs. Colin J. Marsden
British Railway Pictorial: First Generation DMUs.  Kevin Robertson
British Rail Fleet Survey 8: Diesel Multiple Units- The First Generation.  Brian Haresnape
A Pictorial Record of British Railways Diesel Multiple Units.  Brian Golding

External links

 Class 107 Derby 3-car DMUs on Railcar.co.uk
 Mikes Trains

107
Train-related introductions in 1960